Bohdan Masztaler (born 19 September 1949) is a Polish former footballer. During his club career he played for Gwardia Warszawa, Odra Opole, ŁKS Łódź and SV Werder Bremen. He earned 22 caps for the Poland national team, and participated in the 1978 FIFA World Cup.

He coached SV Stockerau and SKN St. Pölten.

References

Living people
1949 births
People from Ostróda County
Sportspeople from Warmian-Masurian Voivodeship
Association football midfielders
Polish footballers
Poland international footballers
1978 FIFA World Cup players
ŁKS Łódź players
Odra Opole players
SV Werder Bremen players
Polish football managers
Polish expatriate footballers
Polish expatriate sportspeople in Germany
Expatriate footballers in Germany
Polish expatriate sportspeople in Austria
Expatriate footballers in Austria